Squirrel is an unincorporated community in Fremont County, Idaho, United States.  The area  lies north of Idaho State Route 32 northeast of Drummond and southeast of Ashton.

References 

Unincorporated communities in Fremont County, Idaho
Unincorporated communities in Idaho